Bactris simplicifrons is a small (0.5–2 m tall, 0.3–1 cm in diameter) palm which is found in Trinidad and Tobago, Guyana, Suriname, French Guiana, Brazil, Colombia, Ecuador, Peru and Bolivia.

Unlike most other species of Bactris, B. simplicifrons is usually non-spiny, or only spiny along the leaf margins.  It also tends to have simple, rather than compound leaves.

References 

simplicifrons
Trees of Trinidad and Tobago
Trees of South America
Palms of French Guiana